The General Intelligence Service (GIS), often referred to as the Mukhabarat is an Egyptian intelligence agency responsible for providing national security intelligence, both domestically and internationally. The GIS is part of the Egyptian intelligence community, together with the Office of Military Intelligence Services and Reconnaissance and National Security Agency. The Egyptian Intelligence service is considered to be the 5th most active intelligence service globally.

History
The decision to set up an Egyptian intelligence service was taken following the Egyptian Revolution of 1952, when Egypt was under increased threat from foreign adversaries, such as the United Kingdom, and the State of Israel. The General Intelligence Directorate was formally established by then Prime Minister, and future President, Gamal Abdel Nasser, in 1954, and placed under the command of Zakaria Mohieddin. The agency's importance rose when Nasser assigned its command to Salah Nasr, who held the post of director of the GID from 1957 to 1967 and thoroughly reorganized the agency. Under Nasr's supervision, the GID relocated to its own building and established separate divisions for Radio, Computer, Forgery and Black Operations. To cover the agency's expenses, Nasr set up Al Nasr Company, ostensibly an import-export firm, as a front organization. He played a very important role helping Algeria, Southern Yemen and many Arab and African states gain independence. Although the Egyptian foreign ministry was officially responsible for foreign affairs, GID initiated and aided many Arab and African movements for independence as a part of Gamal Abdel Nasser's anti-imperialist policies. Nasr established good relations with other intelligence agencies across the globe, which helped providing Egypt with wheat and establishing industries such as (Al Nasr Company for Motor Cars). One of his constructions is the Gezeera Tower in Cairo.

For several years the name of GID director was a secret only known to high officials and government newspapers chief editors. However, Major-General Omar Suleiman, who was the head of the GID from 1993 to January 2011, was the first one to break this taboo. His name was published before he himself became a known face in media after being envoyed by former Egyptian president Mubarak to Israel, USA and Gaza on several occasions.

On 31 January 2011, Major-General Murad Muwafi was declared the director of GID, after Omar Suleiman was appointed as a Vice President of Egypt and then resigned after former president Mubarak had to step down during the Egyptian revolution. He was replaced by Mohamed Raafat Shehata in August 2012 by Egypt's first freely elected president Mohamed Morsi.

In July 2013, as result of 2012–13 Egyptian protests, Mohamed Raafat Shehata was sacked by interim president Adly Mansour and was replaced by General Mohamed Ahmed Fareed al-Tohami.

Achievements 
In spite of the rule that says "success in the intelligence world is a buried secret while failure is a worldwide scandal," the GID did achieve many successes a few of which were released and dramatized in Egyptian TV and cinema.
 The GID states that it managed to plant an Egyptian agent among Jewish immigrants to Israel. That agent, Refaat Al-Gammal, managed to live 18 years in Israel without being discovered. In those years, he established a network of spies in various fields of the Israeli community, though this is contradicted by various Israeli sources, which claim that Refaat was a double agent and helped the IDF to win the Six-Day War.
 In 1970 the GID managed to hunt an Israeli oil rig while being shipped from Canada to Sinai (occupied at that time). Clandestine GID agents and frogmen succeeded in tracing the oil rig to Abidjan, Côte d'Ivoire, and planted sets of explosives, had them detonated and crippled the rig. Ironically, this was done while the city was full, not only of Mossad agents protecting the oil rig, but also while it was full of CIA agents who were guarding the NASA astronauts during their visit to Côte d'Ivoire. This operation was published in 1985 under the name "Al-Haffar Operation" it was supervised at that time by GID director Amin Howeidi (1921–2009).
 Perhaps a major success of the GID was handling the Egyptian "Strategic Deception Plan", which was carried out from January 1970 to October 1973 and aimed to conceal the Egyptian plans to launch a massive operation to free occupied Sinai on 6 October 1973 starting the October war. The plan included planting false information and hidden implied data in Egyptian president Sadat's speeches and newspapers articles. For example, the GID prepared the military operations and evacuated complete sections of Cairo hospitals to be ready for receiving war casualties. This evacuation that took place a few days before the war started, was done after declaring false information that those hospitals were infected with Tetanus. The plan included a major operation whose details are still not published. This operation aimed at getting detailed information of American spy satellites covering the Middle East, by knowing the exact trajectories and timing of those satellites the GID prepared complicated logistic movement schedules for all Egyptian military units to avoid moving mass troops in timings where they could be spotted by satellites.
 Gumaa Al-Shawan who used to provide the Mossad with false information from 1967 to 1973, he also used to get the advanced transmission devices from the Mossad and give it to the GID.
 During the 1973 war with Israel, the GID spied on Mossad weeks prior to the surprise attack on the 6 October 1973. The information derived allowed the director and his associates to identify the weakest points on the Israeli front line. A suicide mission to divert the Israeli counter-attack was initiated to halt Israeli movements into mainland Egypt.
 An Egyptian spy, Amin K., who worked as a staffer in the German government's press office had passed information to the GIS between 2010 and 2019.
Under the lead of Elhamy Aly Elsebaey, The Egyptian GID scored a major success in terms of strategic field between all armies around the world.                              In 2021, Elhamy Elsebaey leading the informatics of GID, defended against the largest cyberattack with his optimum system, which he supervised personally with the support of some leads in IT from all over the world.            Not to mention his lead to the information cybersecurity system in the Egyptian army.                     Elhamy Aly Elsebaey is a very well-known name in GID, yet the public possesses limited information about him.

Director of the General Intelligence

The Director of the General Intelligence serves as the head of the Egyptian General Intelligence Service, which is part of the Egyptian Intelligence Community.  The Director reports to the President. The Director is a civilian or a general or flag officer of the armed forces appointed by the President.

, the current director is Major General Abbas Kamel, while Nasser Fahmi and Sisi's son, Mahmoud el-Sisi, are deputy directors.

According to Mohamed Ali, the building contractor whose online videos criticising president Abdel Fattah el-Sisi sparked off the September 2019 Egyptian protests, Kamel's "main qualification ... was his close relationship with Sisi". Sisi's son Mahmoud, officially one of the deputy directors, was seen by Ali as the de facto real head of the GIS.

List of directors
 Zakaria Mohieddin (1954–1956)
 Ali Sabri (1956–1957)
 Salah Nasr (1957–1967)
 Amin Howeidi (1967–1970)
 Mohammed Hafez Ismail (1970)
 Ahmad Kamel (1970)
 Karim Abdelrahman El-Leithy (1970–1973)
 Ahmad Ismail Ali (1973–1974)
 Ahmad Abdulsalam Tawfiq (1974–1975)
 Kamal Hassan Ali (1975–1978)
 Mohamed Saeed El Mahy (1978–1981)
 Mohamed Fuaad Nassar (1981–1983)
 Mohamed Refat Gibreel (1983–1986)
 Amin Nummur (1986–1989)
 Omar Negm (1989–1991)
 Nour Eddien Afifi (1991–1993)
 Omar Suleiman (1993–2011)
 Murad Muwafi (2011–2012)
 Mohamed Raafat Shehata (2012–2013)
 Mohamed Fareed (2013–2014)
 Khaled Fawzy (2014–2018)
 Abbas Kamel (2018–present)

See also

 Mukhabarat (disambiguation)
 List of (worldwide) intelligence agencies

References

Further reading

1973- Weapons and Diplomacy- Heikal, Mohammd Hassanien - Printed 1993 - Al Ahram- Egypt
Auto biography of Salah Nasr- Printed 1998- Dar Al Khayal - Egypt

1954 establishments in Egypt
Government agencies established in 1954
Law enforcement agencies of Egypt
Egyptian intelligence agencies